Jacob is a surname, ultimately from the Biblical figure Jacob. Jakob is the main German form of the name.

For the meaning of the name, see Jacob (name).

Notable people with the surname Jacob

A–G
 Abe Jacob (born 1944), American sound designer
 Alaric Jacob (1909–1995), British journalist and author
 Alexander Malcolm Jacob (1849–1921), diamond and gemstone trader, sold the Jacob Diamond
 Anund Jacob (c. 1010–1050), a.k.a. Anund Jakob, King of Sweden
 Archibald Jacob (1829–1900), Australian politician
 Archibald Jacob, (1888-1959), British musician, brother of Gordon Jacob
 Ariana Jacob, American artist
 Caroline Jacob (1861–1940), South Australian school principal and owner
 Catherine Jacob (actress) (born 1956), French actress
 Catherine Jacob (journalist) (born 1976), British broadcast journalist and news presenter
 Charles Jacob (geologist) (1878–1962), French geologist
 Charles Jacob (stockbroker) (1921–2015), British stockbroker, promoter of ethical investment
 Charles Donald Jacob (1838–1898), American politician and diplomat
 Christian Jacob (politician) (born 1959), French politician
 Christy Jacob (born 1944), Irish hurler
 Claud Jacob (1863–1948), British soldier
 Claus Jacob (born 1969), German scientist
 Corentin Jacob (born 1997), French footballer
Daryl Jacob (born 1983), Irish jockey 
 E. F. Jacob (1894–1971), British scholar
 Edgar Jacob (1844–1920), British religious leader
 Edward Jacob (c. 1710–1788), British scholar and politician 
 Ephraim Arnold Jacob (1845–1905), American lawyer and judge 
 François Jacob (1920–2013), French biologist
 Franz G. Jacob (1870–?), German chess master
 Georges Jacob (1739–1814), French artist
 Giles Jacob (1686–1744), British jurist and writer
 Gilles Jacob
 Gordon Jacob (1895–1984), British musician

H–Z
 Heinrich Eduard Jacob (1889–1967), German-American writer
 Ian Jacob (1899–1993), British soldier
 Ida Luise Jacob (1826–1904), German cookbook author; see Emmy Braun (pseudonym)
 Irène Jacob (born 1966) French-born Swiss actress
 Jack Farj Rafael Jacob (1921–2016) Lieutenant general, Indian Army
 John Jacob, Marquess of Montferrat (1395–1445), Italian soldier and government administrator
 John Jacob (East India Company officer) (1812–1858)
 John Edward Jacob (born 1934), American activist
 John J. Jacob (Kentucky businessman) (1770–1852), businessman, industrialist and philanthropist
 John J. Jacob (West Virginia politician) (1829–1893), governor
 Ken Jacob, (born 1949) American politician
 Louis Léon Jacob (1768–1854), French admiral
 Marius Jacob (1879–1954), French activist
 Maurice Jacob (1933-2007), French theoretical particle physicist
 Max Jacob (1876–1944), French writer
 Maxime Jacob, or Dom Clément Jacob, (1906–1977), French monk, composer and organist
 Michael Jacob (born 1980), Irish hurler
 Mick Jacob (born 1946), Irish hurler
 Nancy Jacob, American photographer
 Odile Jacob, French publisher
 Pierre Jacob (1953–2018), Canadian politician
 P. L. Jacob, pseudonym of French writer Paul Lacroix (1806–1884)
 Romain Jacob (born 1988), French boxer
 Rory Jacob (born 1983), Irish hurler
 Suzanne Jacob (born 1943), Canadian author
 Teuku Jacob (1929–2007), Indonesian paleoanthropologist
 Teun Jacob (1927–2009), Dutch wall painter and sculptor
 Trevor Jacob (born 1993), American snowboarder accused of deliberately crashing his own plane
 Ursula Jacob (born 1985), Irish camogie player
 Violet Jacob (1863–1946), Scottish writer
 William & Robert (W & R) Jacob, Irish founders of Jacob's biscuit makers

Notable people with the surname Jakob
 Alfons Maria Jakob (1884–1931), German physician
 Hans Jakob (Esperantist) (1891–1967), German-born Swiss Esperantist
 Hans Jakob (footballer) (1908–1994), German soccer player
 Julia Jakob (born 1991), Swiss orienteer
 Liane Jakob-Rost (born 1928), German scholar
 Ludwig Heinrich von Jakob (1759–1827), German economist

See also
Jacob (name)
Jacob (disambiguation)
Jacobs (surname)
Jakob (disambiguation)
Jacobite (disambiguation)
Halimah Yacob (born 1954), eighth president of Singapore

Surnames from given names